Tokyo Ghost is an American science fiction comics series written by Rick Remender, drawn by Sean Murphy and colored by Matt Hollingsworth, released in September 2015 by Image Comics. The current story arc concluded in issue #10, with the possibility of a new story at some point in the future.

The series is set in 2089, a time when humanity is addicted to technology and entertainment. It follows the story of constables Debbie Decay and Led Dent, working as peacekeepers in the Isles of Los Angeles. They are given a job that will take them to the last tech-free country on Earth: the garden nation of Tokyo. Remender summarizes it as being "a big, visual, exciting story that at the heart of it is hiding the fact that it's really a love story".

Reception
Sean Edgar of Paste calls it "a gonzo William Gibson-ish nightmare" showing "Murphy's transportive craft at its height". Jeff Lake of IGN describes it as "a pointed look at the evolution of our desensitized, now-now-now generation" and "absolutely bananas when it comes to action".

Collected editions

Film adaptation
In March 2021, Legendary Entertainment had begun development of a film adaptation of Tokyo Ghost with Cary Joji Fukunaga set to direct and produce.

References

External links
Tokyo Ghost: Image Comics
Sean Gordon Murphy: Crafting Tokyo Ghost

Image Comics titles
2015 comics debuts
Cyberpunk comics
Comics by Rick Remender
Comics by Sean Murphy
Fiction set in the 2080s